Tochi Raina (born 2 September 1971) is an Indian singer, composer and philosopher, best known as a playback singer in Hindi films. His most notable works include the songs Kabira for the movie "Yeh Jawaani Hai Deewani", "Iktara" from "Wake Up Sid", Ishq Waale Chor Hain for the Hindi movie Kya yahi sach hai with Vishal Khurana, Saibo for the Hindi movie Shor in the City a duet with Shreya Ghosal, Maldar Ki Jeb for the movie Bhindi Baazaar Inc. and Aali Re for the movie No One Killed Jessica. He recorded a music album 'Tochinaamah' consisting 3 song – Saaiyaan, Jamoora and Akela

Early life
He was born in a Kashmiri Sikh family to Sahib and Surjit Kumar Raina  in Darbhanga, Bihar and went to school in Nepal where his father, a government employee, was posted. His brother Arvinder is a composer in Malaysia and his sister Harmeet Kaur is a Ph.D. in classical music and also a music teacher in a school in Assam.

He hails from a family with music background. His father played the harmonium, his grandmother was a Sitar player, his uncle, Ratan Singh, a renowned Violin player and his grandfather, Akaali Kaur Singh, a saint. He later moved to Delhi where he started learning music under Pandit Vinod Kumar – a disciple of Indian classical singer Ustad Bade Ghulam Ali Khan. He also learnt music from Ustad Bhure Khan, Ustad Nusrat Fateh Ali Khan, Ustad Altaf Hussain Sarang, Pt. Mani Prasad and Pt. Sitaram. According to him his Gurus not only taught him music, but also to visualize his breath. Slowly, he started visualizing words and he turned to spirituality and Sufi music.

He also sang the Song "Rabba" in Coke Studio @MTV Season 3 which is composed by Amit Trivedi, and the song 'Bannado' in coke Studio @MTV Season 4 which is composed and arranged by Sachin-Jigar and the lyrics ae written by Priya Sariya.

Career
He moved to Mumbai to make a career as a Music Composer & playback singer. Tochi got his first commercial break with Bulleshah in A Wednesday! in 2008. He has been a part of a number of movies and albums as a Music Composer including Bezubaan Ishq, Note Pe Chot and a lot more. He is currently working with his Band of Bandagi and creating soulful Sufi music with the band. Band of bandagi has released their first album Sufi Acoustica with 6 Sufi Songs in it. Tochi has joined hands with Music Distribution Company Movement Creations LLP as Head of the department for music since March 2021. His 4 audio tracks has been released so far including :
'Gayatri Mantra' (Raag Malkauns),
'Alakh Niranjan',
'Hare Krishna',
'Aaj Jaane Ki Zid Na Karo'.

Personal life
He is married and has two daughters, Harleen & Simran. Harleen was born the night he finished recording for Shor in the city.

List of songs

References

1971 births
Living people
Kashmiri people
Indian male playback singers
Bollywood playback singers
People from Darbhanga district